Elsa Woutersen-van Doesburgh (1875-1957) was a Dutch artist.

Biography 
Woutersen-van Doesburgh née van Doesburgh was born on 7 December 1875 in Amsterdam. She attended the Quellinusschool, the Académie des Beaux-Arts in Brussels, and the Rijksakademie van beeldende kunsten. Her teachers included August Allebé, Robert von Haug, and Jacob Ritsema. In 1910 she was awarded the Willink van Collenprijs (The Willink van Collen Award). In 1911 she married Wouter Petrus Wouterse. Her work was included in the 1939 exhibition and sale Onze Kunst van Heden (Our Art of Today) at the Rijksmuseum in Amsterdam.  She was a member of the Arti et Amicitiae.

Willeboordsel died on 	8 March 1957 in Bloemendaal.

References

External links
images of Woutersen-van Doesburgh's work on MutualArt

1875 births
1957 deaths
Artists from Amsterdam
20th-century Dutch women artists